Annette Harbo Lind (born 2 June 1969 in Spøttrup) is a Danish politician, who is a member of the Folketing for the Social Democrats.  She was elected at the 2011 Danish general election. She was a member of the municipal council of Holstebro Municipality from 2010 to 2011.

External links 
 Biography on the website of the Danish Parliament (Folketinget)

References

1969 births
Living people
People from Skive Municipality
Women members of the Folketing
Social Democrats (Denmark) politicians
21st-century Danish women politicians
Danish municipal councillors
Members of the Folketing 2011–2015
Members of the Folketing 2015–2019
Members of the Folketing 2019–2022
Members of the Folketing 2022–2026